Dan Bar-On (October 3, 1938  September 4, 2008) was an Israeli psychologist, therapist, and Holocaust and conflict and peace researcher.

Biography 
Dan Bar-On was born in Haifa, British Mandate Palestine (part of modern-day Israel) in 1938.  Both his parents had immigrated from Nazi Germany in 1933. Before the army, he attended an agricultural high school for two years. For 25 years he lived in Kibbutz Revivim in the Negev where he tended fruit trees, and studied behavioral sciences at Ben Gurion University of the Negev (BGU) in Beer Sheva, Israel. In 1975, he received his MA and worked as a therapist in the kibbutz clinic, specializing in work with families of Holocaust survivors and their children and doing research in this field of work. This later led to his book Fear and Hope: Three Generations of the Holocaust (1998).

In 1981, he received his PhD from the Hebrew University in Jerusalem, and in 1983 he earned a Fulbright scholarship at the Massachusetts Institute of Technology (MIT) in Cambridge, MA. He became a lecturer in behavioral sciences at BGU, and since 1996 was Professor of Psychology and held the David Lopatie Chair for Post-Holocaust Psychological Studies. Twice he was chosen to be Chair of the Department of Behavioral Sciences. He retired in 2007.

In 1987, he travelled to Germany, interviewed children of Nazi criminals, and wrote Legacy of Silence: Encounters with Children of the Third Reich (1989). This book, first published in English, was translated into German, French, Hebrew, and Japanese. Some of Dan Bar-On's German research participants formed a self-help group who met on a regular basis. In 1992 he suggested that they meet with a group of Holocaust survivors. This became the group "To Reflect and Trust" (TRT) where children of Holocaust survivors and children of Nazi perpetrators met. Later, they expanded to groups in other conflict areas (South Africa, Northern Ireland, and Israel/Palestine).

He published several books on dialogue in conflict situations and worked for mutual understanding in the Israeli-Palestinian conflict. In 1998, together with Palestinian Professor Sami Adwan, he founded and co-chaired PRIME: Peace Research Institute in the Middle East in Beit Jala in the Palestinian Authority Territory. In cooperation with six Israeli and six Palestinian school teachers, they prepared a school text book which contrasted Israeli and Palestinian views on recent Middle Eastern History and allowed students to learn the others’ views and insert their own. He also trained mediators for dialogue in conflict in different areas of the world.

He was married, a father of four, and a grandfather. He died in 2008.

Awards and honors 
 1999: Honorary Doctorate, Stockton College, New Jersey (USA)
 2001: Order of Merit of the Federal Republic of Germany
 2001: International Alexander Langer Award (Italy, with Sami Adwan)
 2003: Erich Maria Remarque Peace Award (Germany, with Mahmoud Darwish)
 2005: Victor Goldberg Award for Peace in the Near East (USA, with Sami Adwan)

Select bibliography 
 Legacy of Silence: Encounters with Children of the Third Reich. Cambridge, Massachusetts and London, England: Harvard University Press 1989. .
 Fear and Hope: Three Generations of the Holocaust. Cambridge, Massachusetts and London, England: Harvard University Press 1995. .
 The Indescribable and the Undiscussable: Reconstructing Human Discourse after Trauma. Budapest: Central European University Press 1998. .
 (with Julia Chaitin) Parenthood and the Holocaust. Jerusalem: Yad Vashem 2000. .
 (Editor) Bridging the Gap: Story Telling as a Way to Work through  Political and Collective Hostilities. Hamburg: Edition Körber-Stiftung 2000. .
 Tell Your Life Story: Creating Dialogue among Jews and Germans, Israelis and Palestinians. Budapest: Central European University Press 2006. .
 The Other Within Us: Constructing Jewish-Israeli Identity. Cambridge, England: Cambridge University Press 2008. .
 (With Sami Adwan, Ayal Naveh and the Peace Research Institute in the Middle East) Side by Side: Parallel Histories in Israel-Palestine. New York, NY: The New Press 2012. .

References

External links 
 Peace Research Institute in the Middle East
 CROSSING THE BORDER: Israeli Dan Bar-On - Palestinian Sami Adwan (30 min)

1938 births
2008 deaths
Ben-Gurion University of the Negev alumni
Academic staff of Ben-Gurion University of the Negev
Hebrew University of Jerusalem alumni
Israeli educators
Israeli psychologists
People from Haifa
Officers Crosses of the Order of Merit of the Federal Republic of Germany
20th-century psychologists